General Hammer may refer to:

Ernst Hammer (1884–1957), German Wehrmacht lieutenant general
Heathcote Hammer (1905–1961), Australian Army major general

See also
Julie Hammer (born 1955), Royal Australian Air Force vice marshal